The 2019 Leeds Rhinos season was the clubs 24th season within the Super League. It was the coach's David Furner first season at the clubs but following 5 wins and 11 losses, including a Challenge Cup elimination his contract was terminated and he was replaced by assistant coach Richard Agar for the interim. Kallum Watkins was the club captain for the second consecutive year.

2019 Squad

Transfers 

Source:

2019 Gains:

 Tui Lolohea from Wests Tigers
 Callum McLelland from rugby union
 Trent Merrin from Penrith Panthers
 Konrad Hurrell from Gold Coast Titans
 Dom Crosby from Warrington Wolves
 Danny Tickle from Workington Town

2019 Losses:

 Ryan Hall to Sydney Roosters
 Joel Moon released
 Brett Delaney to Featherstone Rovers
 Jimmy Keinhorst to Hull Kingston Rovers
 Mitch Garbutt to Hull Kingston Rovers
 Jordan Thompson to Hull FC

Results

Challenge Cup

Regular season

League Standings
<noinclude>

References 

 

2019 in English rugby league
Leeds Rhinos seasons